Phillimore Island is an elongated island in the River Thames in the county of Berkshire, England, near the villages of Shiplake, Oxfordshire and Wargrave, Berkshire. It is on the reach above Shiplake Lock.

The island is named after the Phillimore family who were formerly the owners of Shiplake House, now Shiplake College, on the Oxfordshire bank.

Phillimore Island is quite centrally located in the River Thames.

See also
Islands in the River Thames

References

External links 

 Photograph by Henry Taunt from English Heritage

Islands of Berkshire
Islands of the River Thames
Borough of Wokingham